Evania Faaea Pelite  (born 12 July 1995) is an Australian rugby union and rugby league player. She won a gold medal at the 2016 Summer Olympics in Rio.

Pelite made her debut for the Australian women's national rugby sevens team at the age of 17 at the 2013 Amsterdam Women's Sevens. She also represented Australia in touch rugby.

Pelite was selected to represent Australia in rugby sevens at the 2016 Summer Olympics. She was a member of Australia's team at the 2016 Olympics, defeating New Zealand in the final to win the inaugural Olympic gold medal in the sport.

She also won a silver medal at the 2018 Commonwealth Games.

Pelite was named in the Australia squad for the Rugby sevens at the 2020 Summer Olympics. The team came second in the pool round but then lost to Fiji 14-12 in the quarterfinals. Full details.

Honours and achievements
 2019, Dubai Sevens performance tracker player of the round

References

External links
 
 
 
 

1995 births
Living people
Australian female rugby union players
Australian female rugby sevens players
Australia international rugby sevens players
Rugby union players from Brisbane
Rugby sevens players at the 2016 Summer Olympics
Olympic rugby sevens players of Australia
Touch footballers
Olympic gold medalists for Australia
Olympic medalists in rugby sevens
Medalists at the 2016 Summer Olympics
Recipients of the Medal of the Order of Australia
Australian female rugby league players
New Zealand Warriors (NRLW) players
Rugby sevens players at the 2018 Commonwealth Games
Commonwealth Games rugby sevens players of Australia
Commonwealth Games silver medallists for Australia
Rugby sevens players at the 2020 Summer Olympics
Commonwealth Games medallists in rugby sevens
Medallists at the 2018 Commonwealth Games